Acme Chattogram (Bengali: অ্যাকমি চট্টগ্রাম) is a professional field hockey team based in Chittagong. It was one of the founding teams of professional franchise field hockey league HCT Bangladesh. Founded in 2022, the team is owned by Acme Group.They are the champions of the inaugural season.

History
Acme Group bought one of the six teams from the inaugural season of the Hockey Champions Trophy Bangladesh. Waseem Ahmad became the head coach of Acme Chattogram for the inaugural season.They became champion of the inaugural season.

Current technical staff
As of October 2022

Current Roster
As of October 2022

Seasons

References

Field hockey in Bangladesh
Field hockey teams
Sport in Chittagong